A presidential spokesman or Spokesperson is an official appointment by the president given to an individual who serves to convey official comments on behalf of the president.

In Indonesia, a presidential spokesman was appointed for the first time during the era of President Abdurrahman Wahid.

List of the Presidential Spokesperson of the Republic of Indonesia ;

References 

Presidents of Indonesia